Jan Polanc (born 6 May 1992) is a Slovenian racing cyclist, who currently rides for UCI WorldTeam . He is a two time Giro d'Italia stage winner.

Major results

2009
 National Junior Road Championships
1st  Road race
3rd Time trial
 10th Overall Grand Prix Général Patton
2010
 1st  Time trial, National Junior Road Championships
 2nd Trofeo Guido Dorigo
 3rd Trofeo Buffoni
 4th Overall Giro della Lunigiana
1st Stage 3
 5th Road race, UCI Juniors Road World Championships
 8th Overall Course de la Paix Juniors
 10th Overall Trofeo Karlsberg
2011
 5th Overall Giro della Regione Friuli Venezia Giulia
 5th Trofeo Città di San Vendemiano
 7th Gran Premio di Poggiana
 8th Trofeo Banca Popolare di Vicenza
 8th Giro del Belvedere
 10th Trofeo Zsšdi
2012
 1st  Time trial, National Under-23 Road Championships
 1st Piccolo Giro di Lombardia
 1st  Young rider classification, Tour of Slovenia
 2nd Overall Okolo Jižních Čech
 5th Overall Czech Cycling Tour
 6th Trofeo Città di San Vendemiano
 9th Overall Giro della Regione Friuli Venezia Giulia
 9th Trofeo Zsšdi
 9th Trofeo Banca Popolare di Vicenza
2013
 1st  Overall Giro della Regione Friuli Venezia Giulia
1st  Young rider classification
1st Stage 4
 2nd Overall Tour of Slovenia
1st  Young rider classification
 5th Overall Course de la Paix Under-23
 5th La Côte Picarde
 8th GP Kranj
 10th Overall Istrian Spring Trophy
2014
 9th Japan Cup
2015
 Giro d'Italia
1st Stage 5
Held  after Stages 5–7
 5th Japan Cup
 6th Giro dell'Emilia
 8th Overall Tour of Slovenia
2017
 1st  Time trial, National Road Championships
 Giro d'Italia
1st Stage 4
Held  after Stages 4–11
 1st  Mountains classification, Tour La Provence
 5th Overall Tour of Croatia
2019
 6th Overall Tour of Turkey
 6th Overall Tour of Oman
 6th Overall Giro di Sicilia
 7th Overall Adriatica Ionica Race
 9th Overall Tour of Slovenia
 Giro d'Italia
Held  after Stages 12–13
2020
 3rd Time trial, National Road Championships
 6th Gran Trittico Lombardo
2021
 National Road Championships
2nd Road race
2nd Time trial
 5th Giro dell'Appennino
 9th Overall Tour of Slovenia
2022
 1st Trofeo Laigueglia
 3rd Time trial, National Road Championships
 7th Overall Settimana Internazionale di Coppi e Bartali

Grand Tour general classification results timeline

References

External links

 
 
 
 
 
 

1992 births
Living people
Slovenian male cyclists
Slovenian Giro d'Italia stage winners
Sportspeople from Kranj
Cyclists at the 2016 Summer Olympics
Olympic cyclists of Slovenia
Cyclists at the 2020 Summer Olympics